"Wild Heart" is a song by British pop rock band The Vamps. It was released in the United Kingdom on 19 January 2014 as the second single from their debut studio album Meet the Vamps (2014).

The single also includes a cover of McFly's 5 Colours in Her Hair.

Background
"Wild Heart" was written by all four members of The Vamps along with Amund Bjørklund, Espen Lind, Ben Harrison, Ibrahim "Ayb" Asmar, and Jamie Scott. There are eight different versions of the track to purchase, including one featuring vocals from English singer Pixie Lott.

When asked about writing the song by MTV News, guitarist James McVey explained: "We really enjoyed making [their previous single] Can We Dance but with Wild Heart we kind of experimented more with musical genre in the sense that we added a banjo and mandolin. We like to try and push ourselves into directions to try new things really and we've gone for more of a folky vibe so we hope people like it. We like to think it's a feel good song I guess." Frontman Brad Simpson admitted that the song "influenced the rest of the album sound almost just because it was such a key song for us."

Critical reception
Lewis Corner of Digital Spy gave the song a mixed review, stating: "Ironically, as their namesake suggests, the group intend to do so by repeating the current pop music rhythm. 'Tonight we'll dance/ I'll be yours and you'll be mine,' frontman Bradley croons over Mumford & Sons-lite guitars and beats; the kind that have been thrust firmly into the mainstream by 1D, Ed Sheeran and even Avicii in recent years. We don't blame them though as the formula has an undeniable success rate – and while 'Wild Heart' is far from pushing any kind of boundaries, you'll be hard pushed to get it out of your head anytime soon."

Chart performance
On 23 November, the song debuted at number six on the Irish Singles Chart, making it their highest-charting single to date in this country. It then debuted at number three on the UK Singles Chart three days later, giving The Vamps their second consecutive UK top 3 hit.

Music video
A "live video" was uploaded to YouTube on 22 July 2013. The official music video was directed by Dean Sherwood. It was uploaded to YouTube on 3 December 2013. As of March 31, 2021, it has more than 55 million views on YouTube.

Formats and track listings
Digital download
 "Wild Heart" – 3:11

Digital download - EP
 "Wild Heart" (Nashville Mix) – 3:11
 "Five Colours in Her Hair" – 2:57
 "Twist & Shout" – 2:39
 "Why'd You Only Call Me When You're High?" – 2:40

Digital download - Remix EP
 "Wild Heart" (Nashville Remix) – 3:11
 "Wild Heart" (Tristan Animal Version) – 3:12
 "Wild Heart" (James & Connor Version) – 3:11
 "Wild Heart" (Digital Dog Remix) – 3:11
 "Wild Heart" (featuring Pixie Lott) – 3:39

 Digital download - Live Single
 "Wild Heart" (Live) – 3:23

 CD1
 "Wild Heart" - 3:11
 "You Said No"
 "Best Song Ever"
 "Are You Gonna Be My Girl"

 CD2
 "Wild Heart" (James & Connor Version) - 3:11
 "A Thousand Years"

 DVD
 "Wild Heart" (music video)
 "Carry on Vamping" (documentary)

Charts and certifications

Charts

Certifications

Release history

References

2014 singles
The Vamps (British band) songs
Virgin EMI Records singles
Mercury Records singles
2014 songs
Songs written by Amund Bjørklund
Songs written by Espen Lind
Songs written by Jamie Scott